Ralph Vos (born 1 October 1996) is a Dutch football player who plays for Blauw Geel '38.

Club career
He made his professional debut in the Eerste Divisie for RKC Waalwijk on 16 March 2015 in a game against FC Oss.

References

External links
 
 

1996 births
People from Maasdonk
Living people
Dutch footballers
RKC Waalwijk players
FC Den Bosch players
TOP Oss players
Eerste Divisie players
Derde Divisie players
Sportspeople from Oss
Association football goalkeepers
Blauw Geel '38 players
Footballers from North Brabant
21st-century Dutch people